Penicillium glaucoalbidum is a species of the genus of Penicillium.

References

glaucoalbidum
Fungi described in 2011